Bitching may refer to:
A form of the word bitch
"Bitching", a song by The Stranglers from No More Heroes

See also 
Bitchin (disambiguation)